1215 Boyer, provisional designation , is a stony Eunomian asteroid from the central region of the asteroid belt, approximately 20 kilometers in diameter. It was discovered by astronomer Alfred Schmitt in 1932, who named it after French astronomer and college Louis Boyer.

Discovery 

Boyer was discovered on 19 January 1932, by French astronomer Alfred Schmitt at the Algiers Observatory in Algeria, North Africa. Eight days later, it was independently discovered by Karl Reinmuth at Heidelberg Observatory in Germany. The body's observation arc begins at Algiers with its official discovery observation.

Classification and orbit 

Boyer is a member of the Eunomia family, the most prominent family in the intermediate main-belt, which mostly consists of stony asteroids. Conversely, Boyer has also been grouped into the Maria family.

It orbits the Sun at a distance of 2.2–2.9 AU once every 4 years and 2 months (1,512 days). Its orbit has an eccentricity of 0.13 and an inclination of 16° with respect to the ecliptic.

Physical characteristics 

In the Tholen classification, Boyer is a common, stony S-type asteroid.

Lightcurves 

In August 2008 and May 2012, two rotational lightcurves of Boyer were obtained from photometric observations by an international collaboration of astronomers studying the rotational properties of Maria asteroids, using the ground-based Wise Observatory in Israel. Lightcurve analysis gave a rotation period of 10.36 hours with a brightness variation of 0.31 and 050 magnitude, respectively.

Diameter and albedo 

According to the surveys carried out by the Japanese Akari satellite and NASA's Wide-field Infrared Survey Explorer with its subsequent NEOWISE mission, Boyer measures between 13.041 and 24.65 kilometers in diameter and its surface has an albedo between 0.116 and 0.3012.

The Collaborative Asteroid Lightcurve Link assumes an albedo of 0.21, derived from the Eunomia family's largest member and namesake, 15 Eunomia, and calculates a diameter of 17.47 kilometers with an absolute magnitude of 11.1.

Naming 

This minor planet was named by the discoverer after his colleague at Algiers Observatory, Louis Boyer (1901–1999), who worked extensively on asteroids and comets. Boyer himself was a discoverer of minor planets at Algiers. He later worked on identifications at Nice observatory. The official  was published by the Minor Planet Center on 1 August 1978.

References

External links 
 Asteroid Lightcurve Database (LCDB), query form (info )
 Dictionary of Minor Planet Names, Google books
 Asteroids and comets rotation curves, CdR – Observatoire de Genève, Raoul Behrend
 Discovery Circumstances: Numbered Minor Planets (1)-(5000) – Minor Planet Center
 
 

001215
Discoveries by Alfred Schmitt
Named minor planets
001215
19320119